Duck is a nickname of the following people:

 Duck Edwing (born 1934), American cartoonist, particularly for Mad magazine
 Donald "Duck" Dunn (born 1941), bass player for Booker T. & the M.G.'s and The Blues Brothers
 Devlin Hodges (born 1996), American National Football League quarterback
 Jimmy "Duck" Holmes (born 1947), American blues musician
 Duck Baker (born 1949), American guitarist
 Duck MacDonald, American rock guitarist
 Donald "Duck" Richardson (1935–2011), American basketball coach
 Wayne Carey (born 1971), former Australian rules footballer

See also 

 Duck (disambiguation)
 Duck (surname)
 Ducky (disambiguation), which includes a list of people with the nickname
 Goose (nickname)

Lists of people by nickname